James Leslie Randall (4 August 1828 – 17 January 1922) was an English Anglican prelate and the inaugural Bishop of Reading from 1889 until 1908.

Biography 
Randall was born in Dorking, Surrey, the son of James Randall, Archdeacon of Berkshire, and Rebe Lowndes. He was educated at Winchester College and  New College, Oxford. He held incumbencies at Newbury, Sandhurst and Mixbury before being appointed Archdeacon of Buckingham, a post he held until elevation to the episcopate. He died on 17 January 1922 and after his death a committee was  set up to fund, then place, a memorial to honour his 56 years service to the Diocese of Oxford.

In 1902 he presented a decorative font-cover, designed by G. F Bodley, to the Oxford Cathedral, in memory of his late wife.

Death 
He died in Bournemouth, aged 93.

References

1828 births
1922 deaths
People from Dorking
People educated at Winchester College
Alumni of New College, Oxford
Archdeacons of Buckingham
Bishops of Reading